The 1996 World Single Distance Speed Skating Championships were held between 15 and 17 March 1996 in the Vikingskipet, Hamar, Norway. This was the first World Single Distance championships.

Schedule

Medal summary

Men's events

Women's events

Medal table

References

1996 World Single Distance
World Single Distance Speed Skating Championships
World Single Distance, 1996
Sport in Hamar
World Single Distance Speed Skating Championships